Capparelli is an Italian surname. Notable people with the surname include:

 Ralph C. Capparelli (1924–2020), American politician
 Roberto Capparelli (1923–2000), Bolivian footballer
 Vittorio Capparelli, Canadian politician

Italian-language surnames